Reginald Manning may refer to:

 Reg Manning (1905–1986), American artist and illustrator
 Reginald Kerr Manning (1866–1943), Australian equity, bankruptcy and probate barrister